David Jurásek (born 7 August 2000) is a Czech footballer who currently plays as a midfielder for Slavia Prague. He has played for the Czech Republic at youth level. His former clubs include Zbrojovka Brno, Prostějov, and Mladá Boleslav.

Club career
Jurásek began his career in the academy at Dolní Němčí, later moving to Slovácko and then to Zbrojovka Brno.

He made his professional debut for Zbrojovka Brno in a 0–0 draw against Dukla Prague on 1 July 2020, replacing Ondřej Vaněk as a substitute in the final minute. After six Czech National Football League appearances for the club, Jurásek signed for Prostějov in July 2020. At Prostějov, Jurásek made 25 league appearances, scoring three times, before signing for Czech First League club Mladá Boleslav in July 2021. Upon joining Mladá Boleslav, Jurásek told Prostějov-based newspaper Prostějovský Večerník that his time in the second tier with Prostějov had been instrumental in earning a move to Mladá Boleslav. On 21 August 2021, Jurásek made his debut in the Czech First League, starting in a 3–1 win against Teplice.

On 10 February 2022, following one goal and two assists in 15 league games, Slavia Prague announced Jurásek and fellow Mladá Boleslav teammate Daniel Fila had signed for the club, with the pair both signing contracts until June 2026.

International career
On 4 April 2017, Jurásek made his debut for the Czech Republic's under-17 side, playing in a 4–1 win against Belgium. Four years later, Jurásek earned his second youth cap for the Czech Republic, representing the under-21 team in a 3–0 win against Kosovo.

Career statistics

Club

References

External links
 Profile at FC Zbrojovka Brno official site
 Profile at FAČR official site

2000 births
Living people
Czech footballers
FC Zbrojovka Brno players
FK Mladá Boleslav players
SK Slavia Prague players
Association football midfielders
Czech National Football League players
Czech First League players
Czech Republic youth international footballers
Czech Republic under-21 international footballers
1. SK Prostějov players
People from Uherské Hradiště
Sportspeople from the Zlín Region